Daughters of Jacob Bridge (Gesher Bnot Ya'akov; , Jisr Benat Ya'kub) is a bridge that spans the last natural ford of the Jordan River at the southern end of the Hula Basin between the Korazim Plateau and the Golan Heights. It has been a crossing point for thousands of years.

The Crusaders called the site Jacob's Ford. The medieval bridge was replaced in 1934 by a modern bridge further south during the draining of Lake Hula by the Palestine Land Development Company.

Located southwest of the bridge are the remains of a Crusader castle known as Chastellet and east of the bridge are the remains of a Mamluk khan (caravanserai).

The bridge is now part of Highway 91 and straddles the border between the Galilee and the Golan Heights (which was annexed by Israel in 1981).  It is of strategic military significance as it is one of the few fixed crossing points over the upper Jordan River that enable access from the Golan Heights to the Upper Galilee.

The caravan route from China to Morocco via Mesopotamia and Egypt used this crossing. It was part of the ancient highway recently dubbed "Via Maris", which was strategically important to the Ancient Egyptians, Assyrians, Hittites, Jews, Saracens (early Muslims), Crusaders, Ayyubids, Mamluks, Ottomans, and modern inhabitants and armies who crossed the river at this place. The Crusaders built a castle overlooking the ford which threatened Damascus which was destroyed by Saladin in 1179 in the Battle of Jacob's Ford. The old arched stone bridge marked the northern limit of Napoleon's advance in 1799.

Etymology
The place was first associated with the biblical forefather of the Jews, Jacob/Israel, due to a confusion. The Crusader-era nunnery of Saint James (Saint Jacques in French) from Safed received part of the customs paid at the ford, and since James/Jacques is derived from Jacob, this led to the name Jacob's Ford.

History and archaeology of the ford site

Prehistory
Archaeological excavations at the prehistoric Gesher Benot Ya'aqov site have revealed evidence of human habitation in the area, from as early as 750,000 years ago. Archaeologists from the Hebrew University of Jerusalem claim that the site provides evidence of "advanced human behavior" half a million years earlier than has previously been estimated as possible. Their report describes a layer at the site belonging to the Acheulian (a culture dating to the Lower Palaeolithic, at the very beginning of the Stone Age), where numerous stone tools, animal bones and plant remains have been found. According to the archaeologists Paul Pettitt and Mark White, the site has produced the earliest widely accepted evidence for the use of fire, dated approximately 790,000 years ago. A Tel-Aviv University study found remains of a huge carp fish cooked with the use of fire at the site 780,000 years ago.

Crusader and Ayyubid period

Jacob's Ford was a key river crossing point and major trade route between Acre and Damascus. It was utilized by Christian Palestine and Seljuk Syria as a major intersection between the two civilizations, making it strategically important. When Humphrey II of Toron was besieged in the city of Banyas in 1157, King Baldwin III of Jerusalem was able to break the siege, only to be ambushed at Jacob's Ford in June of that year.

Later in the twelfth century, Baldwin IV of Jerusalem and Saladin continually contested the area around Jacob's Ford. Baldwin allowed the Templars to build Chastelet castle overlooking Jacob's Ford known to the Arabs as Qasr al-'Ata commanding the road from Quneitra to Tiberias. On 23 August 1179, Saladin successfully conducted the siege of Jacob's Ford, destroying the unfinished fortification, known as the castle of Vadum Iacob or Chastellet.

Mamluk and Ottoman bridge

In the late Mamluk period, Sefad became a principal town and Baibars' postal road from Cairo to Damascus was extended with a branch that went through the north of Palestine. To accomplish this, the bridge was built over the Crusaders' Vadum Jacob (Jacob's ford). The bridge had the Mamluk characteristic dual-slope pathway like the Yibna Bridge. Al-Dimashqi (1256–1327) noted that "the Jordan traverses the district of Al Khaitah and comes to the Jisr Ya'kub (lit. "Jacob's Bridge"), under Kasr Ya'kub (lit. "Jacob's Castle"), and reaching the Sea of Tiberias, falls into it."

Before 1444, a merchant constructed a khan (caravanserai) on the eastern side of the bridge, one of a series of such khans built at the time. Edward Robinson noted that during the 14th century, travellers crossed the river Jordan below the Lake of Tiberias, while the first crossing in the area of Jisr Benat Yakob was noted in 1450 CE. The khan, at the eastern end of the bridge, and the bridge itself, were both probably built before 1450, according to Robinson.

For the year 1555−1556 CE (AH 963) the toll post at the bridge collected 25,000 akçe, and in 1577 (985 H) a firman commanded that the place had post horses ready.

On June 4th 1771, a combined force of Zahir al Umar's men and mamluk commander Abu al-Dhahab met the Damascene Pasha in battle, The result was a victory for the Zayadina coalition and established control of Irbid and Quneitra to Zahir al Umar. This also set in motion the later Final Invasion of Damascus Eyalet & Siege of Damascus by Abu al-Dhahab

The bridge was maintained through the Ottoman period, with a caravanserai on one end of the bridge, as shown in the 1799 Jacotin map. During the Egyptian campaign of 1799, Napoleon sent his cavalry commander, general Murat, to defend the bridge, as a measure of preempting reinforcement from Damascus being sent to Akko during the siege laid by the French. Murat occupied nearby Safed and Tiberias, as well as the bridge and, by relying on the superior quality of French troops, managed to defeat Turkish units far outnumbering him. Jacotin's map marks the west side of the bridge with the name of General Murat and the date of 2 April 1799.

In 1881, the PEF's Survey of Western Palestine (SWP) also noted about Jisr Benat Yakub: "The bridge itself appears to be of later date than the Crusader period."

20th century

Another battle was fought there on 27 September 1918 during the Palestine Campaign of World War I, at the beginning of the pursuit by the British Army of the retreating remnants of the Ottoman Yildirim Army Group towards Damascus. The central arch of the bridge was destroyed by the Turkish forces. The bridge was shortly repaired by ANZAC sappers, flattening the original dual-slope pathway, making it useful for modern vehicles.

In 1934, during the draining of Lake Hula as part of a Zionist land reclamation project, the old bridge was replaced by a modern one further south.

On the "Night of the Bridges" between 16 and 17 June 1946, the bridge was again destroyed by the Jewish Haganah. The Syrians captured the bridge on June 11, 1948, during the 1948 Palestine war, but later withdrew as a result of the 1949 Armistice Agreements between Israel and Syria. After the war, the bridge was in the central demilitarised zone established by the armistice agreement.

In 1953, the site was chosen as the original location for the water intake of Israel's National Water Carrier project, but after US pressure the intake was moved downstream to the Sea of Galilee at Eshed Kinrot, which later became known as the Sapir Pumping Station at Tel Kinrot/Tell el-'Oreimeh.

During the Six-Day War, an Israeli paratrooper brigade captured the area and after the war the Israeli Combat Engineering Corps constructed a Bailey bridge. In the Yom Kippur War, Syrian forces approached the vicinity of the bridge and as a precaution Israeli sappers placed explosives on the bridge but did not detonate them as the Syrians did not attempt to cross it.

21st century
In 2007, one of the two Bailey bridges at the site (one for traffic from east to west and the other handling traffic in the opposite direction) was replaced with a modern concrete span, while the other Bailey bridge was left intact for emergency use.

See also
Archaeology of Israel and Levantine archaeology
Barid, Muslim postal network renewed during Mamluk period (roads, bridges, khans)
Jisr al-Ghajar, stone bridge south of Ghajar
Al-Sinnabra Crusader bridge, with nearby Jisr Umm el-Qanatir/Jisr Semakh and Jisr es-Sidd further downstream
Jisr al-Majami bridge over the Jordan, with Mamluk khan
Jisr Jindas bridge over the Ayalon near Lydda and Ramla
Yibna Bridge or "Nahr Rubin Bridge"
Isdud Bridge (Mamluk, 13th century) outside Ashdod/Isdud
Jisr ed-Damiye, bridges over the Jordan (Roman, Mamluk, modern)
Bir Ma'in, Arab village near Ramle, connected by a foundation legend to Jacob/Ya'kub and Daughters of Jacob Bridge/Jisr Benat Ya'kub.
Jacob's Well, site associated with biblical Jacob in Samaritan and Christian tradition
Jubb Yussef (Joseph's Well), site associated with biblical Joseph in Muslim tradition

References

Bibliography

 (pp. 341−344)
 

Murray, Alan V. editor. (2006), The Crusades: An Encyclopaedia,

External links
Survey of Western Palestine, Map 4: IAA, Wikimedia commons
Bridge at Jisr Banat Ya'qub, 12th-century bridge pictured early 20th century.
 80th Brigade's Battles in the Six-Day War. Paratroopers Brigade website. 
 Bridge Destruction During the Night of the Bridges 
 Gesher Benot Ya'aqov Acheulian Site Project

Battles of the Crusades
Battles involving the Ayyubids
Bridges over the Jordan River
Crusade places
Hula Valley